David Anthony Mann Sr.  (born August 7, 1966) is an American actor and gospel singer who has starred in many Tyler Perry plays, including I Can Do Bad All By Myself, Madea's Family Reunion, Madea's Class Reunion, Meet the Browns, and What's Done in the Dark. His character Mr. Brown is the father of Madea's daughter Cora (played by his real life wife, Tamela Mann). Mann also reprised his role as the character in the movies Tyler Perry's Meet the Browns and Tyler Perry's Madea Goes to Jail.

Mann was born in Fort Worth, Texas, USA. He has been married to Tamela Mann since 1988; they were both previous members of Kirk Franklin's vocal ensemble "The Family" before working with Tyler Perry. In 2018, he and Tamela recorded a romantic soul album together called Us Against the World.

Filmography

Film

Television

Discography
 Mr. Brown's Good Ol' Time Church (2007)
 The Master Plan: Special Edition (with wife, Tamela Mann) (2010)
 Us Against The World: The Love Project (2018)

References

External links
 Official Web Site
 

1966 births
21st-century American singers
American gospel singers
African-American Christians
American male film actors
American male stage actors
Living people
Male actors from Fort Worth, Texas
Comedians from Texas
21st-century African-American musicians